Edward Leavy (August 14, 1929 – March 12, 2023) was a United States circuit judge of the United States Court of Appeals for the Ninth Circuit and a former judge for the United States Foreign Intelligence Surveillance Court of Review. Prior to these positions, Leavy was a United States district judge of the United States District Court for the District of Oregon.

Education and career
Leavy was born on August 14, 1929, in Butteville, Oregon, along the Willamette River south of Portland in 1929. He received his Bachelor of Arts degree from the University of Portland in 1950, and earned his Bachelor of Laws from the Notre Dame Law School in 1953. Leavy entered private legal practice in Eugene in Lane County, Oregon, in 1953, where he remained until becoming a deputy district attorney for Lane County the following year. He served in that position until 1957.

Judicial career

In 1957, Leavy became a district court judge for the county, and in 1961 became an Oregon circuit court (trial level court in Oregon) judge when the district courts in Oregon were abolished. He continued as a judge in Lane County until 1976, and in 1974 spent time as a justice pro tempore on the Oregon Supreme Court. From 1976 until 1984 he was a United States Magistrate of the United States District Court for the District of Oregon headquartered in Portland.

Leavy was nominated by President Ronald Reagan on March 26, 1984, to a seat on the United States District Court for the District of Oregon vacated by Judge Robert C. Belloni. He was confirmed by the United States Senate on April 24, 1984, and received commission on May 3, 1984. His service terminated on April 8, 1987, due to elevation to the Ninth Circuit.

Leavy was nominated by President Reagan on February 2, 1987, to a seat on the United States Court of Appeals for the Ninth Circuit vacated by Judge Otto Richard Skopil Jr. He was confirmed by the Senate on March 20, 1987, and received commission on March 23, 1987. He assumed senior status on May 19, 1997. In 2019, he was on panels regarding Donald Trump's asylum ban and Trump's rule against abortion counseling at federally funded facilities.

Death
Leavy died on March 12, 2023, at the age of 93. He had been in hospice care for several months.

See also
 List of Jewish American jurists

References

External links

1929 births
2023 deaths
20th-century American judges
Judges of the United States Court of Appeals for the Ninth Circuit
Judges of the United States District Court for the District of Oregon
Oregon state court judges
Justices of the Oregon Supreme Court
Notre Dame Law School alumni
Lawyers from Eugene, Oregon
People from Marion County, Oregon
United States court of appeals judges appointed by Ronald Reagan
United States district court judges appointed by Ronald Reagan
United States magistrate judges
University of Portland alumni
Judges of the United States Foreign Intelligence Surveillance Court of Review